Build.com is an online home improvement retailer, and subsidiary of Ferguson plc. It sells bathroom, kitchen and lighting hardware, appliances and other supplies. The company is headquartered in Chico, California, United States.

History 
In 1995, Build.com was launched by David Berman who was at the time a plumbing wholesaler. Berman's new Build.com enterprise built websites for companies in the building products industry and Berman launched the company officially at the 1995 Kitchen and Bath Show (KBIS) in New Orleans that year. To launch the company he built a website for German faucet company, Grohe. Berman worked with Al DE Genova, Grohe America's head of marketing, and traded the website for a corner of the Grohe America booth at the KBIS trade show. At this point in the infancy of the internet, Grohe.com represented the first website in the U.S. plumbing industry. Following the Grohe America website, Build.com acquired other clients including Delta Faucets. Quickly, Berman realized the power of e-commerce and launched retail sites: Faucet.com, Lighting.com etc. The URL Build.com became an umbrella site for all of Berman's e-commerce kitchen and bath products websites (the website design company became BuildingOnline.com and was based in Dana Point, CA). 

In 1999, Christian Friedland and David Boctor created an e-commerce website called Faucet Direct to sell plumbing supplies. The pair offered 40% of their business for $40,000 to their employer Slakey Brothers, but the offer was declined. The team continued to work on the website and launched FaucetDirect.com, which they operated out of Friedland's condo.

By 2006 Friedland, who owned 52% of the company, began seeking venture capitalist investments, which led him to sell the business to British plumbing and heating equipment distributor Wolseley (renamed Ferguson plc in 2017) for $35 million. Wolseley purchased the build.com domain in 2009 from David Berman, which allowed Friedland to rebrand the site with its current name. In 2015, Build.com acquired the small appliances and web-only merchant Living Direct Inc. The company expanded its Chico offices in September 2018 by relocating 70 employees.

References

External links 
 

Retail companies established in 2000
Internet properties established in 2000
Companies based in Chico, California
Online retailers of the United States
Home improvement retailers of the United States
2000 establishments in California